San Uk Tsai is a village in Lam Tsuen, Tai Po District, Hong Kong.

Administration
San Uk Tsai is a recognized village under the New Territories Small House Policy.

References

External links
 Delineation of area of existing village San Uk Tsai (Tai Po) for election of resident representative (2019 to 2022)

Villages in Tai Po District, Hong Kong
Lam Tsuen